Paragu (10 November 1921 – 9 April 2011) was a Burmese writer. He was a multilingual writer in Burmese, Japanese, Hindi and Pali and published 100 books until he died. He built and owned a library, the Paragu Shantiniketan Library, in Yangon. He was buried at the Yayway Cemetery in Yangon.

References

 ပြန်ကြားရေးနှင့် ပြည်သူ့ ဆက်ဆံရေး ဦးစီး ဌာန (ရုံးချုပ်) စာတည်း အဖွဲ့က စုဆောင်း ပြုစုတဲ့ 'နှစ်ဆယ် ရာစု မြန်မာ စာရေး ဆရာ များနှင့် စာစု စာရင်း' စာအုပ် (ပညာရွှေတောင် စာအုပ်တိုက်)၂ဝဝ၃ ခုနှစ်၊ ဧပြီလ(ပထမ အကြိမ်)

Burmese writers
1921 births
2011 deaths
Banaras Hindu University alumni
People from Ayeyarwady Region
Japanese-language writers
Hindi-language writers